The Calculating Stars is a science fiction novel by American writer Mary Robinette Kowal. The book was published by Tor Books on July 3, 2018. It is the first book in the "Lady Astronaut" series and is a prequel to the 2012 short story "The Lady Astronaut of Mars".

Plot
Shortly after President Thomas Dewey leads the United States to victory in the space race in 1952, a meteorite strikes the Chesapeake Bay, obliterating most of the Eastern Seaboard. In the aftermath, the mathematician and former Women Airforce Service Pilots pilot Elma York calculates that the resulting climate change will make the planet uninhabitable within 50 years. The threat accelerates efforts to colonize space and leads to Elma joining the International Aerospace Coalition in its attempt to reach the Moon and then Mars.

Reception
The Calculating Stars won the 2019 Nebula Award for Best Novel, the 2019 Locus Award for Best Science Fiction Novel, the 2019 Hugo Award for Best Novel, and the 2019 Sidewise Award for Alternate History.

Publishers Weekly considered it "outstanding," with Elma's personal life "provid(ing) a captivating human center to the apocalyptic background."

James Nicoll praised Kowal for being willing to include historically accurate racial and gender issues.

References

External links
"The Calculating Stars" on Kowal's website
Interview with Kowal about the process of writing the novel, on Space.com
  We Interrupt This Broadcast, prequel short story

2018 American novels
2018 science fiction novels
English-language novels
Hugo Award for Best Novel-winning works
Nebula Award for Best Novel-winning works
Sidewise Award for Alternate History winning works
Tor Books books